Tchiamba-Nzassi is a district in the Kouilou Region of Republic of the Congo.

References 

Kouilou Department
Districts of the Republic of the Congo